Father Cami's Wedding (Spanish: La boda del señor cura) is a 1979 Spanish drama film directed by Rafael Gil and starring José Sancho, José Bódalo and Manuel Tejada.

Cast

References

External links

1979 drama films
Spanish drama films
Films directed by Rafael Gil
1970s Spanish-language films
1970s Spanish films